Pontocola is a ghost town in Lee County, in the U.S. state of Mississippi.

History
Pontocola is a name derived from the Chickasaw language purported to mean "hanging grapes". A post office operated under the name Pontocola from 1858 to 1904.

References

Geography of Lee County, Mississippi
Ghost towns in Mississippi